This is a list of films shot in Adelaide or in the state of South Australia.

Films

See also
 Australian Film Commission
 Cinema of Australia
 Film Australia
 Screen Australia
 South Australian Film Corporation
 World cinema
 List of Australian films
 List of films set in Australia
 List of films shot in Darwin
 List of films shot in Melbourne
 List of films shot in Queensland
 List of films shot in Sydney
 List of films shot in Tasmania
 List of films shot in Western Australia

References

Further reading 
 Adamson, Judith. A Film Australia miscellany. Lindfield, N.S.W. : Film Australia, 1991.
 Collins, Felicity, and Theresa Davis. Australian Cinema After Mabo. Sydney: Cambridge University Press, 2004.
 Dawson, Jonathan, and Bruce Molloy, eds. Queensland Images in Film and Television. Brisbane: University of Queensland Press, 1990.
 Dermody, Susan and Elizabeth Jacka, eds. The Screening of Australia, Volume 1: Anatomy of a Film Industry. Sydney: Currency Press, 1987.
 —  —  — . The Screening of Australia, Volume 2: Anatomy of a National Cinema. Sydney: Currency Press, 1988.
 Moran, Albert and Tom O’Regan, eds. An Australian Film Reader (Australian Screen Series). Sydney: Currency Press, 1985.
 Moran, Albert and Errol Vieth. Film in Australia: An Introduction Sydney: Cambridge University Press, 2006.
 Murray, Scott, ed. Australian Film: 1978 – 1994. Melbourne: Oxford University Press, 1995. 
 Pike, Andrew and Ross Cooper. Australian Film: 1900 – 1977. revised ed. Melbourne: Oxford University Press, 1998. 
 McFarland, Brian, Geoff Mayer and Ina Bertrand, eds. The Oxford Companion to Australian Film. Melbourne: Oxford University Press, 1999. 
 Moran, Albert. Projecting Australia : government film since 1945. Sydney : Currency Press, 1991. .
 Moran, Albert and Errol Vieth. Historical Dictionary of Australian and New Zealand Cinema. Lanham, Md: Scarecrow Press, 2005. 
 O'Regan, Tom. Australian National Cinema. London: Routledge, 1996.
 Reade, Eric. Australian Silent Films: A Pictorial History of Silent Films from 1896 to 1926. Melbourne: Lansdowne Press, 1970.
 —  —  — . History and Heartburn : The Saga of Australian Film 1896-1978. New Jersey: Associated University Presses, 1981.
Ryan, Mark, David (2009),'Whither Culture? Australian Horror Films and the Limitations of Cultural Policy', Media International Australia: Incorporating Culture and Policy, no. 133, pp. 43–55.
 Stratton, David. The Avocado Plantation: Boom and Bust in the Australian Film Industry. Sydney : Pan Macmillan, 1990. 465p. 
 Verhoeven, Deb. Sheep and the Australian Cinema. Melbourne : MUP, 2006. 
 —  —  —  ed. Twin Peeks: Australian and New Zealand Feature Films. Melbourne: Damned Publishing, 1999.

External links 
 South Australia Film Corporation
 australianscreen
 Australian Film, Television and Radio School
 Australian Government site on Film in Australia
 Australian Centre for the Moving Image (Victoria)
 Screen Australia
 Filmwest (Western Australia)
 Screen NSW (New South Wales)

Films
Adelaide